Povilas Stravinsky is a Lithuanian pianist active in the United States, where he serves as the Orchestra Seattle artist in residence.

A graduate from the Moscow Conservatory, he has been a professor at the Lithuanian Academy of Music and Theatre and was named an Honored Artist of Lithuania. He has recorded for Melodiya.

References
  Orchestra Seattle & Seattle Chamber Singers
  The Boston Globe
  Tucson Symphony Orchestra

Lithuanian classical pianists
Living people
Academic staff of the Lithuanian Academy of Music and Theatre
21st-century classical pianists
Year of birth missing (living people)